Retha Swindell is an American retired athlete. She was the first black woman to play with the Texas Longhorns women's basketball team and was one of the UT women's basketball program's first two All-Americans. During her tenure, she scored 1,795 points and 1,759 rebounds.

Early life
Swindell was born and raised in Texas, where she attended Center High School. During her high school career, she competed in track and basketball. In 1973, she set a national record of 37 feet, 10 inches at the University Interscholastic League Class A Girls State Track and Field meet. The following year, Swindell also won the high jump at 4-feet, 10-inches, placed first in the long jump at 16-feet, 4-inches, and also won first in the triple jump at 35-feet, 10 -inches. Beyond track, Swindell also played center in women's basketball and was named all-district for three consecutive years and all-state for two consecutive years. As a result of her athleticism, Swindell was recruited by coach Rod Page to join the Texas Longhorns women's basketball team on academic scholarships.

Career
Following the passing of Title IX, the Texas Longhorns women's basketball transitioned from an intramural sport to a varsity sport. Upon joining the team, she changed her position from guard and had to learn how to shoot the ball. As a freshman, Swindell made it to the final cuts of the 1976 Montreal Olympic women's basketball team tryouts. As a junior, she averaged 11 points per game and hit 19 in the 1977–78 season's opener while recording 17 rebounds. She also changed her major from computer science to physical education. At the conclusion of the season, Swindell earned a place on the United States international touring team. In her senior season, Swindell averaged 9.0 points and 8.4 rebounds while also leading the team in blocked shots. As such, she was nominated team MVP for the second time in her career. Swindell concluded her collegiate career with 1,795 points and 1,759 rebounds. In June 1979, Swindell was drafted 13th overall by the Chicago Hustle of the Women's Professional Basketball League.

Upon graduating from UT, Swindell spent time with the United States Select women's basketball team and two-years in the now-defunct Women's Professional Basketball League. She spent one season with the Chicago Hustle before being traded to the Milwaukee Express who subsequently folded. As such, she joined the Dallas Diamonds as a free agent and helped them to the championship game against Nebraska. In 1986, Swindell replaced Gloria Pruitt as head coach of the girl's varsity basketball program at Robert E. Lee High School. In 2001, Swindell was recognized for her collegiate career with an induction into the University of Texas' Women's Athletics Hall of Honor.

References

Living people

Year of birth missing (living people)
American women's basketball players
Texas Longhorns women's basketball players
African-American basketball players
University of Texas alumni
Women's Professional Basketball League players